Michael Webb (born June 19, 1979, in North Vancouver, British Columbia) is a Canadian rugby player, who has played for Newfoundland Rock and the Canadian national team.  He has usually played flanker. 
In 2007, Webb played two games as a substitute in the Rugby World Cup.

A well regarded leader throughout his rugby development, Webb was named captain of the Canadian side in his test debut May 2004 vs USA.  Canada won that match 23–20.  Webb is the 33rd Canadian captain.

Bio

A product of West Vancouver Secondary School, Webb has played for Vancouver Under-17 before being selected for Canada U19 at the 1998 FIRA championships, where Canada placed fourth.  Webb continued on to play for Canada in all of its development levels including Young Canada, Canada "A", and Canada Sevens.

A graduate of the Pacific Sport Academy in Victoria, Webb captained the Pacific Pride/Young Canada in the highly successful 2002–04 seasons, touring Germany, Chile and the Cayman Islands.

In 2004, Webb played for Canada at the Wellington, New Zealand and Los Angeles, USA sevens before going to the Super Powers Cup in Japan where he would make his test debut.

Webb played in all of Canada’s games in 2005, captain against England ‘A’ and the USA.

Badly injured against France in November 2005, Webb returned to international action against the US in Canada’s RWC qualifying match in St. John’s in August 2006. That same year, Webb played against Wales and Italy on Canada’s November tour to Europe.

Webb had been captain of his hometown side, the Vancouver Wave, before leaving Vancouver for St. John’s, Newfoundland to pursue academic training in clinical epidemiology.  While in eastern Canada, Webb represented the Newfoundland Rock, and Canada East on numerous occasions.

References

 http://knowtheplayers.com/search.php?id=377
 http://www.scrum.com/scrum/rugby/player/14491.html
 https://web.archive.org/web/20111006231753/http://206.191.48.235/index.php?lang=en&page_id=112

1979 births
Living people
Canadian rugby union players
Sportspeople from British Columbia
Canada international rugby union players
Canada international rugby sevens players